The King Faisal Specialist Hospital and Research Centre (KFSH&RC) is tertiary referral hospital in Riyadh, the capital city of Saudi Arabia.

Overview
As a tertiary referral hospital, it offers primary and highly specialized inpatient and outpatient medical care and participates in clinical and research studies. Overall, it has been ranked 600th globally. A large portion of the patient population are referrals from other hospitals from across Saudi Arabia as a whole and the surrounding regions.

History
KFSH&RC was established in 1970 on land donated by King Faisal and was officially opened in 1975 by King Khalid. From 1973 to 1985, the hospital was administered by the Hospital Corporation of America (HCA). In 1985, following a Royal Decree, the contract with HCA ended and the responsibility for the administration and operation of the hospital's premises was undertaken by a national team.

The following are some key developments:

 In 1997, The King Fahd National Centre for Children's Cancer opened.
 In 2000, King Faisal Specialist Hospital & Research Centre – Jeddah Branch opened.
 In 2002, King Faisal Specialist Hospital and Research Centre becomes a corporation.
 In 2018, The King Abdullah Centre for Cancer and Liver Diseases opened.
 In 2019, King Faisal Specialist Hospital & Research Centre – Madina branch opened.
 In 2021, KFSH&RC was transformed into an independent not-for-profit organization.

Notable events
 King Fahad died in August 2005.
 King Salman underwent surgery for his gallbladder in July 2020.
 Mohammad Bin Salman was admitted and underwent surgery for appendicitis in February 2021.

See also

 List of hospitals in Saudi Arabia
 List of things named after Saudi Kings
 King Saud Medical Complex

References

1975 establishments in Saudi Arabia
Hospital buildings completed in 1975
Hospitals established in 1975
Hospitals in Saudi Arabia
Buildings and structures in Jeddah
Buildings and structures in Riyadh
Organisations based in Riyadh
Companies based in Riyadh
Medical research institutes in Saudi Arabia